The list of University of Florida Tennis Players includes former athletes of the Florida Gators men's tennis and Florida Gators women's tennis teams of the University of Florida who have competed on the professional tennis circuit.  The list includes such athletes as Lisa Raymond, Nicole Arendt, Jill Craybas, and Jesse Levine.

Players

Gallery

See also 

 Florida Gators
 List of University of Florida alumni
 List of University of Florida Athletic Hall of Fame members
 List of University of Florida Olympians

References

External links 

 Official website of the Florida Gators

 
 
tennis players
Florida Gators